Sarah Bartlett Churchwell (born May 27, 1970) is a professor of American Literature and Public Understanding of the Humanities at the School of Advanced Study, University of London, UK. Her expertise is in 20th- and 21st-century American literature and cultural history, especially the 1920s and 1930s.  She has appeared on British television and radio and has been a judge for the Booker Prize, the Baillie Gifford Prize, the Women's Prize for Fiction, and the David Cohen Prize for Literature. She is the director of the Being Human festival and the author of three books: The Many Lives of Marilyn Monroe; Careless People: Murder, Mayhem and the Invention of The Great Gatsby; and Behold America: A History of America First and the American Dream. In April 2021, she was long listed for the Orwell Prize for Journalism.

Early life
Churchwell grew up in Winnetka, near Chicago, Illinois. She earned a BA in English Literature from Vassar College and an MA and PhD in English and American Literature from Princeton University.

Career
Churchwell lectured at the University of East Anglia from 1999 until 2015, when she became Professor of American Literature and Public Understanding of the Humanities and director of the Being Human festival at the School of Advanced Study at London University.

She has written for The New York Review of Books, The New York Times Book Review, The Times Literary Supplement, The Spectator, the New Statesman, The Guardian and The Observer,  the Financial Times, Prospect, The Times, The Sunday Times, The Daily Telegraph, The Independent, the Independent on Sunday, as well as international newspapers including Süddeutsche Zeitung, Blätter, the Times of India, The Hindu Times, and many others.

Her books include The Many Lives of Marilyn Monroe (2004); and Careless People: Murder, Mayhem and the Invention of The Great Gatsby (2013) about F. Scott Fitzgerald.

Her television appearances include on Newsnight, Question Time, The Review Show, and The Sharp End with Clive Anderson. C-Span, the Today Show (NBC), BBC Politics Live, Sunday Morning Live, This Week, Sky News, BBC Breakfast, The Cinema Show, the Sunday Programme, ITV This Morning, the Culture Show, the DVD Collection, and Before the Booker. She has contributed to many documentaries including BBC2’s Novels that Shaped Our World (2019), Icons, with Kathleen Turner (2019), Unfinished Masterpieces (2014), Arena’s T. S. Eliot, The Rules of Film Noir, and Great Poets: In Their Own Words, and the feature film Love, Marilyn (d: Liz Garbus, 2012).

Radio appearances include the Today Programme, Front Row, Any Questions, Woman’s Hour, The Jeremy Vine show, BBC World Service, Radio Five Live, The Verb, Free Word, BBC Radio 3 Free Thinking, BBC Radio 3 Essays, BBC Radio 4 In Our Time and Great Lives, among many others. She has written and presented Radio 4 documentaries on Henry James, the American Dream and America First, The Great Gatsby, When Harry Met Sally, and Radio 3 essays on Screen Goddesses (2017) and Screen Gods (2019).

Churchwell was a judge for the 2014 Man Booker Prize,  the 2017 Baillie Gifford Prize, and the 2019 Sunday Times Short Story Prize.

She was Writer in Residence at the Eccles Centre for American Studies in 2015.

Work
 The Many Lives of Marilyn Monroe. Picador, 2005. .
 Careless People: Murder, Mayhem and the Invention of The Great Gatsby. Little, Brown Book Group Ltd, 2013. .
 Behold America: A History of America First and the American Dream. Bloomsbury, 2018. .
 The Wrath to Come: Gone with the Wind and the Lies America Tells. Apollo Publishing International, 2022. .

Edited volumes
 Forgotten Fitzgerald: Echoes of a Lost America. (London: Virago, October 2014). .
 Must Read: Rediscovering American Bestsellers, co-editor with Dr Thomas Ruys Smith. (New York: Bloomsbury Academic, 2012). .
 Introduction to L. Frank Baum, The Wizard of Oz (London: Pan Macmillan, 2018).    
 Introduction to Henry James, The Ambassadors (London: Everyman, 2016).    
 Introduction to Iris Murdoch, The Sea, The Sea and A Severed Head (London: Everyman, February 2016). .   
 Introduction to Julian Barnes, Flaubert’s Parrot and A History of the World in 10 ½ Chapters (London: Everyman, 2012). .   
 Introduction to James Fenimore Cooper, The Last of the Mohicans (London: Folio Society, 2011).    
 Introduction to Pale Horse, Pale Rider: The Selected Stories of Katherine Anne Porter (London: Penguin Books, 2011). .    
 Introduction to Flappers and Philosophers: The Collected Stories of F. Scott Fitzgerald. (London: Penguin Books, 2010). .

References

External links
 Sarah Churchwell Profile at School of Advanced Study, University of London 
 
 Sarah Churchwell, columns at The Guardian
 Sarah Churchwell Princeton 
 Mark Gustafson, "The World Behind Gatsby: An Interview with Sarah Churchwell" at Rain Taxi.
 
 Sarah Churchwell on the BBC

1970 births
Living people
Academics of the University of East Anglia
American columnists
American emigrants to England
21st-century American non-fiction writers
The New York Review of Books people
People from Winnetka, Illinois
Princeton University alumni
Vassar College alumni
21st-century American women writers
American women columnists
American women academics